Rod Thomas (born 1947) is a Welsh international footballer.

Rod or Rodney Thomas may also refer to:

 Rod Thomas (bishop) (born 1954), English Anglican bishop
 Rod Thomas (English footballer) (born 1970)
 Rod Thomas (born 1982/83), Welsh musician known professionally as Bright Light Bright Light
 Rodney Thomas (1973–2014), American football player
 Rodney Thomas II, American football player

See also
 Rob Thomas (disambiguation)
 Roy Thomas (disambiguation)